Leptospermum polygalifolium subsp. cismontanum, commonly known as tantoon, is a subspecies of flowering plant in the family Myrtaceae and is endemic to near-coastal areas of eastern Australia. It is a shrub or small tree with elliptical leaves and white flowers in spring.

Description
Flowering occurs in September and October and the fruit is a capsule  in diameter.

Taxonomy
This subspecies was first described in 1989 by Joy Thompson in the journal Telopea, from specimens collected near Dungog in 1975.

Distribution and habitat
Leptospermum polygalifolium subsp. cismontanum is common in near-coastal forests between Fraser Island in Queensland and Gosford in New South Wales. It often grows on sandstone but is also found in coastal swamps, old dunes and hillsides.

References

polygalifolium subsp. cismontanum
Myrtales of Australia
Flora of New South Wales
Flora of Queensland
Plant subspecies
Taxa named by Joy Thompson
Plants described in 1989